Euroa is a town in the Shire of Strathbogie in the north-east of Victoria, Australia. At the 2021 census, Euroa's population was 3,116.

The name Euroa comes from an Aboriginal word in the old local dialect meaning 'joyful'.

History

Major T.L. Mitchell camped on the banks of the Seven Creeks at Euroa during his 1836 "Australia Felix" expedition. 
The Post Office opened on 1 January 1854 in the old town, as the township was settled.

Euroa's claim to fame is that the National Bank was robbed by Ned Kelly in 1878.  Much of the region's wealth once came from sheep but now it comes from horse studs.

The Euroa Magistrates' Court closed on 1 January 1990.

Heritage sites

Euroa contains a number of heritage-listed sites, including:
 1 Binney Street: National Bank of Australasia Building
 90 Binney Street: Euroa Post Office
 99 Binney Street: Euroa Court House

Facilities 
Euroa is roughly midway between Melbourne and Albury. The area is geographically very flat, as the town is located in the huge Goulburn Valley, however the Strathbogie Ranges are not far away.

Euroa also has a range of accommodation options such as the Euroa Motor Inn, Castle Creek Motor Inn, Jolly Swagman Motor Inn and Accommodation Euroa.

The town is home to the Shire of Strathbogie headquarters. The shire was established as part of the conservative Kennett government mass rationalisation across Victoria in the 1990s. Shire of Strathbogie incorporates the former Shires of Euroa, Violet Town, and Goulburn.

The town was bypassed by a deviation of the Hume Highway that was constructed around 1992.

The town is located on the main North East railway, and is served by V/Line passenger services from Euroa station.

Schools

St John's Primary School 
St John's is Euroa's only Catholic primary school and has served the Euroa community since 1921. The school has an approximate enrolment of 180 students and, from its founding until 2002, the school was run by the Sisters of Mercy.

The current principal is Libby Hamilton.

Euroa Primary School 
Euroa Primary School (School Number: 1706) is the town's only government-run primary school. Euroa Primary School No:1706 is located in picturesque central Victoria, Australia, and has an enrolment of 180 students. There is a mixture of historical, refurbished, and modern open plan buildings, with extensive playgrounds and an oval.

Euroa Secondary College 

Euroa Secondary College (School Number: 7820) is the only secondary school in the Shire of Strathbogie and, in 2007, had an enrolment of 371 students. These students come from the surrounding area including Nagambie, Avenel, Longwood, Ruffy and Violet Town. The current principal is Ms Leanne Whinfield

Sport
The town has an Australian rules football team, the "Euroa Magpies", competing in the Goulburn Valley Football League.

In June 1952, during the 1952 VFL season, a senior Victorian Football League (VFL) game was played at Euroa Oval. The match was organised as part of an effort by the Australian National Football Council (ANFC) to promote the sport, and the other matches in the round were played in Albury, Brisbane, Hobart, Sydney, and Yallourn (all non-standard venues). The match in Euroa drew a crowd estimated at 7,500 people.

Golfers play at the course of the Euroa Golf Club  on Walters Road.

Notable people

Gallery

See also
 Euroa railway station, Victoria
 Strathbogie Voices consultative citizen group

References

External links

Community website
Australian Places - Euroa

Hume Highway
Euroa
Towns in Victoria (Australia)
Shire of Strathbogie